Václav Vokolek (born January 1, 1947, in Děčín) is a Czech writer and painter.

Books 

 Nápisy (vlastním nákladem, 1992)
 Lov žen a jiné odložené slavnosti (GMA, Praha 1993)
 Ten který (Turské pole 1993)
 Triptych (Petrov 1995)
 Pátým pádem (Triáda, Praha 1996)
 Zříceninový mramor (Torst, Praha 1996)
 Pán z Halabákova (Vera, Praha 1997)
 Tanec bludných kořenů (Host, Brno 1998)
 Unangenehme Geschichte (Cambria, Hildesheim 1999)
 Cesta do pekel (Triáda, Praha 1999)
 Hercynský les (Periplum, Olomouc 2000)
 Okolím Bábelu (Votobia, Olomouc 2000)
 Nejsme jako my (spolu s J. Strašnovem - Votobia, Olomouc 2001)
 Příliš pozdní léto (Periplum, Olomouc 2003)
 Krajinomalby (Omen 2004)
 Pohled z druhé strany (spolu s M.Pekárkem - Pragma, Praha 1998)
 Tajemství zdraví a naděje (spolu s M. Pekárkem - Eminent, Praha 2000)
 Tajemství geopatogenních zón (spolu s E. Andresem - Eminent, Praha 2002)
 Esoterické Čechy 1. - 2. díl (Eminent, Praha 2004)

Exhibitions 
 1968 Litvínov
 1969 Gelsenkirchen
 1977 Praha
 1977 Blansko
 1978 Brno
 1979 Wroclaw
 1979 Olesnica
 1980 Budapest
 1981 Walbrzych
 1984 Bremen
 1984 Olomouc
 1985 Praha
 1987 Kostelec nad Č. Lesy
 1990 Roztoky u Prahy
 1991 Děčín
 1995 Plzeň
 1998 Praha
 2003 Olomouc
 2003 Děčín
 2004 Plzeň

Permanent exhibitions in galleries
 Czech national gallery (in exposition)
 Permanent exposition on castle in Bystřice pod Hostýnem (together with Vojmír Vokolek)
 Gallery Louny
 Gallery Pardubice
 Dům umění Olomouc
 BWA Wroclaw
 Gallery Cyrany
 Cloister Plasy

References

External links

 http://www.ipetrov.cz/autor.py/W155

1947 births
Living people
People from Děčín
Czech painters
Czech male painters

Czech monarchists